Kenji Nener (ニナー 賢治, born 26 May 1993) is a Japanese triathlete. He competed in the men's event at the 2020 Summer Olympics held in Tokyo, Japan. He also competed in the mixed relay event. Nener was born in Australia to an Australian father and a Japanese mother. He initially represented his country of birth, but switched allegiances when he was granted Japanese citizenship in 2021. Nener also competes in Super League Triathlon races.Nener's biggest success in Super League racing came in 2022, when he finished 3rd at SLT Toulouse, Super League's first ever event in France.

References

External links
 

1993 births
Living people
Japanese male triathletes
Australian male triathletes
Olympic triathletes of Japan
Triathletes at the 2020 Summer Olympics
Sportspeople from Perth, Western Australia
Australian people of Japanese descent
Naturalized citizens of Japan